Nileh Safid (also Romanized as Nīleh Safīd; also known as Nīleh and Nīla) is a village in Chalanchulan Rural District, Silakhor District, Dorud County, Lorestan Province, Iran. At the 2006 census, its population was 200, in 49 families.

References 

Towns and villages in Dorud County